Souskanikha is a rural locality (a selo) in Krasnogorsky District of Altai Krai, Russia, located  from the city of Biysk, in the Biya River floodplain. It is named after the Souskanikha River, the name of which, in turn, means "diving water" in Turkic.

History
It was founded in the late 19th century by settlers from central Russia.

Infrastructure
House of Culture
Secondary school accommodating 73 students as of 2010-2011
Clinic
Pharmacy
6 stores as of 2010
Administration
Post office

Economy
Most of the population is employed in agriculture, especially in animal-breeding, bee-keeping, and farming.

External links
Website of the secondary school in Souskanikha 

Rural localities in Krasnogorsky District, Altai Krai